The NewMusic was a weekly music and culture television newsmagazine that aired on the Canadian television stations owned by CHUM Limited: MuchMusic, MuchMoreMusic, Citytv, A-Channel and CP24.

Created by John Martin, and intended to combine the spirit of magazines like Rolling Stone and New Musical Express with the format of a television newsmagazine, The NewMusic presented current popular music in a broad social, political and economic context. It won an Iris Award in 1984.

The series was cancelled in 2008 amid ownership changes: the CHUM Limited properties were sold to CTVglobemedia (now Bell Media) a year prior in 2007, whilst the Citytv stations were acquired by Rogers Media the same year. Following its cancellation, the brand has been resurrected as a blog that features news items, concert reviews and exclusive pictures.

Hosts
Jeanne Beker (1979–1985)
J. D. Roberts (1979–1985)
Daniel Richler (1985–1987)
Laurie Brown (1985–1990)
Denise Donlon (1986–1993)
Jana Lynne White (1990–1996)
Kim Clarke Champniss (1993–1996)
Avi Lewis (1996–1998)
Byron Wong (1998–2000)
George Stroumboulopoulos (2000–2004)
Hannah Sung (2004–2006)
Hannah Simone (2006–2008)

Theme song

There have been many songs used for the theme during the opening credits, each reflecting the music of the time. The original music was the opening bars of "Overture" from Rush's 2112, whereas the most recent theme song was an interpolation of Pigbag's "Papa's Got a Brand New Pigbag", which was also used as the show's theme during the early 1980s.

Citytv original programming
2000s Canadian documentary television series
Entertainment news shows in Canada
Much (TV channel) original programming
Pop music television series
Rock music television series
1970s Canadian music television series
1980s Canadian music television series
1990s Canadian music television series
2000s Canadian music television series
1979 Canadian television series debuts
2008 Canadian television series endings